Gortimer Gibbon's Life on Normal Street is an American live action family television series created by David Anaxagoras. The series is presented on Amazon Prime Video. The series follows Gortimer Gibbon and his two best friends, Mel and Ranger, as they navigate Normal Street, a seemingly ordinary suburb with hints of something magical just below the surface. As of June 2018, the series airs on the Universal Kids cable network in the US.

On February 25, 2015, Amazon renewed Gortimer Gibbon's Life on Normal Street for a second season. Filming began on May 4, 2015. Season 2 premiered on October 30, 2015, and concluded on July 15, 2016.

Cast 
 Sloane Morgan Siegel as Gortimer Gibbon
 Ashley Boettcher as Mel Fuller
 Drew Justice as Ranger Bowen
 David Bloom as Stanley Zielinski
 Chandler Kinney as Catherine Dillman
 Coco Grayson as Abigail Arroyo
 Ryder Cohen as Gardner Gibbon
 Robyn Lively as Claire Gibbon
 Kim Rhodes as Vicki Bowen
 Paula Marshall as Lora Fuller
 Benjamin Koldyke as Greg Gibbon
 Luke Matheny as Fred Fisher

Episodes

Season 1 (2014-15)

Season 2 (2015-16)

Reception 
Reception for Gortimer Gibbon's Life on Normal Street has been highly positive. Brian Lowry of Variety gave it a positive review, saying "there are relatively few live-action shows intended to appeal to the prepubescent set that won't send parents fleeing from the room ... in terms of kids' TV, this sort of genuinely clever alternative is anything but normal." Time gave it a highly positive review, saying there's a surfeit of sharp TV for younger kids both on commercial and public TV. It's when kids get a little older that the quality choices dry up, the Disney Channel sitcoms multiply, and you find yourself searching for reruns of Malcolm in the Middle. But Amazon's newest debut finally aims at that niche of original, non-obnoxious TV for tweens that used to be filled by series like Nickelodeon's The Adventures of Pete & Pete ... Normal Street like a pleasant throwback, both in its attitude and its style." The Los Angeles Times called it "a charmer" and the New York Post called it "smart, a little zany and never pandering".

Awards

References

External links 

 Gortimer Gibbon's Life on Normal Street on Amazon Video

2010s American comedy-drama television series
2014 American television series debuts
2016 American television series endings
Amazon Prime Video original programming
English-language television shows
Middle school television series
Amazon Prime Video children's programming
Television series about teenagers
Television series by Amazon Studios